Elizabeth Payne may refer to:

Elizabeth Payne, mother of Sir John Rogers, 1st Baronet
Elizabeth Payne, mother of Albemarle Bertie, 9th Earl of Lindsey
Elizabeth Payne, second wife of William Edmond
Elizabeth Payne, wife of John Julius Angerstein
Elizabeth Payne, third wife of Thomas Lucas
Elizabeth Penn Payne, American actress who played Alexis Meade in the first season of US television series Ugly Betty
Elizabeth Payne, variant spelling for Elizabeth Pain, settler in colonial Boston who may have partly inspired the character Hester Prynne in The Scarlet Letter